The Charles J. Neif House is a historic house at 1410 Pecan Street in Texarkana, Arkansas.  It is a single-story wood-frame structure clad in novelty siding.  The house has a poorly-documented construction history, but is distinctive as a well-preserved Craftsman-style bungalow in a neighborhood of later and larger houses.  The land on which it stands was subdivided for development in 1894, and a house had been built on the land by 1905, probably by Charles Neif.  In 1910 the property was acquired by Albert T. O'Neill, whose family lived there until 1915.  It appears likely that O'Neill gave the earlier structure its Craftsman appearance, with broad overhangs and exposed rafters, although evidence of its earlier history survives in its one-over-one windows, which are a form more typically found in turn-of-the-century construction.

The house was listed on the National Register of Historic Places in 1994.

See also
National Register of Historic Places listings in Miller County, Arkansas

References

Houses on the National Register of Historic Places in Arkansas
Houses completed in 1914
Houses in Miller County, Arkansas
Buildings and structures in Texarkana, Arkansas
National Register of Historic Places in Miller County, Arkansas